Michael Ray Barrowman (born December 4, 1968) is an American former competition swimmer, Olympic champion, and former world record-holder.  Barrowman was one of the pioneers of the "wave-style" breaststroke technique.  Prior to attending University of Michigan, he trained with Montgomery Square Copenhaver Swim Club and the Rockville-Montgomery Swim Club in Maryland.

He placed fourth in the 1988 Summer Olympics in the 200-meter breaststroke.  He set a world record in the same event the following year at the USA Swimming Long Course National Championships with a time of 2:12.90.  The following year at the 1990 Goodwill Games he recorded a time of 2:11.53 and beat two other swimmers who also bested the previous world mark. in 1991, he was named Champion of the World in the World Championships in Perth, Australia, winning the 200-meter breaststroke in world record time.  At the 1992 Summer Olympics in Barcelona, he won the gold medal in the same event in world record time.  He later temporarily retired from swimming and took up competitive flatwater kayaking, competing at the U.S. Olympic Festival in 1995.  He is now a banker, and part-time masters swim coach in the Cayman Islands, but had previously owned a film studio which created an award-winning underwater television program for children, "Under the Waves".  Barrowman was known for his high consumption of hamburgers and French fries during his taper period just prior to a major meet, while he would maintain a strict diet during training season.

Barrowman attended the University of Michigan, and swam for the Michigan Wolverines swimming and diving team in National Collegiate Athletic Association (NCAA) and Big Ten Conference competition.  He was named the Big 10 Athlete of the Year (all sports) in 1991.  Between 1989 and 1991, he won three consecutive NCAA national championships in the 200-yard breaststroke, and was named NCAA Swimmer of the Year in 1990.  His NCAA record of 1:53.77 from 1990, would stand strong for eleven years, and was the oldest men's NCAA record in 2001, when it was broken by Brendan Hansen.  Barrowman broke the world record in the 200-meter breaststroke six times, and held the world's record for over thirteen years; both achievements are world records in themselves.

He was named World Swimmer of the Year in 1989 and 1990 by Swimming World Magazine, and was inducted into the International Swimming Hall of Fame in 1997.

See also
 List of members of the International Swimming Hall of Fame
 List of Olympic medalists in swimming (men)
 List of University of Michigan alumni
 List of World Aquatics Championships medalists in swimming (men)
 World record progression 200 metres breaststroke

References

External links
 
 
 

1968 births
Living people
American male breaststroke swimmers
World record setters in swimming
Michigan Wolverines men's swimmers
Olympic gold medalists for the United States in swimming
People from Costa Mesa, California
Sportspeople from Asunción
Sportspeople from Montgomery County, Maryland
Swimmers at the 1987 Pan American Games
Swimmers at the 1988 Summer Olympics
Swimmers at the 1992 Summer Olympics
World Aquatics Championships medalists in swimming
Medalists at the 1992 Summer Olympics
Pan American Games silver medalists for the United States
Pan American Games medalists in swimming
Big Ten Athlete of the Year winners
Competitors at the 1990 Goodwill Games
Medalists at the 1987 Pan American Games